This is an incomplete list of works by the Estonian composer Arvo Pärt.

Compositions

Vocal and choral works
 Our Garden for children's chorus and orchestra (1959/2003)
 Solfeggio for chorus (1964/1996)
 Credo for chorus, orchestra, and piano solo (1968)
 An den Wassern zu Babel saßen wir und weinten for voices or choir and organ or ensemble (1976/1984)
 Missa syllabica for chorus and organ (1977/1996)
 Summa for chorus (1977)
 Sarah Was Ninety Years Old for three voices, percussion and organ (1977/1990)
 De profundis for men's voices, percussion (ad lib.) and organ (1980)
 Passio for soloists, vocal ensemble, choir and instrumental ensemble (1982)
 Es sang vor langen Jahren for alto, violin and viola (1984)
 Wallfahrtslied for tenor or baritone and string quartet or string orchestra (1984/2000)
 Te Deum for chorus, string orchestra and tape (1984–1985/1992)
 Stabat Mater for 3 voices and string trio (1985)
 Magnificat for chorus (1989)
 Miserere for soloists, choir, ensemble and organ (1989/1992)
 Bogoróditse Djévo (rus. Богородице Дево) for chorus (1990)
 The Beatitudes (1990)
 Berliner Messe for SATB soloists or chorus with organ or string orchestra (1990/1992)
 7 Magnificat-Antiphonen for chorus (1991)
 And One of the Pharisees for three voices (1992)
 Litany for soloists, chorus and orchestra (1994)
 Cantate Domino canticum novum for chorus or soloists and organ (1996)
 Dopo la Vittoria for chorus (1996)
 I Am the True Vine for chorus (1996)
 The Woman with the Alabaster Box for chorus (1997)
 Tribute to Caesar for chorus (1997)
 Kanon Pokajanen for chorus (1997)
 2 Slawische Psalmen for chorus or soloists (1997)
 Triodion for chorus (1998)
 Como cierva sedienta for soprano, chorus and orchestra (1998)
 Cantiques des degrés for chorus and orchestra (1999/2002)
 Cecilia, vergine romana for chorus and orchestra (1999/2002)
 My Heart is in the Highlands for countertenor and organ (2000)
 Which Was the Son of... (2000)
 Littlemore Tractus for chorus and organ (2001)
 Nunc Dimittis for chorus (2001)
 Salve Regina for chorus and organ (2001)
 Zwei Wiegenlieder for two women's voices and piano (2002)
 Peace upon you, Jerusalem for female chorus (2002)
 Most Holy Mother of God for four voices (2003)
 In Principio for chorus and orchestra (2003)
 Da pacem Domine for four voices (2004)
 L'Abbé Agathon for soprano, four violas and four celli (2004/2005)
 Anthem of St John the Baptist written for St John's College, Oxford (2005)
 Von Angesicht zu Angesicht for soprano, baritone, clarinet, viola and double bass (2005)
 Estonian Lullaby for female choir or 2 female voices and string orchestra (2006)
 Rozhdestvenskaya kolybel'naya / Christmas Lullaby for female choir or voice and string orchestra (2006) for soprano, 4 violas and 4 violoncellos (2009)
 Veni creator for mixed choir or SATB soloists and organ (2006), for mixed choir and string orchestra (2009)
 Morning Star for mixed choir (2007)
 Sei gelobt, du Baum for baritone, violin, quinterne and double bass (2007)
 The Deer's Cry written for chorus for Louth Contemporary Music Society, Ireland (2008)
 Alleluia-Tropus for mixed vocal ensemble or chamber choir and 8 violoncellos ad lib. (2008), for mixed choir and string orchestra (2010)
 Adam's Lament for mixed choir and string orchestra (2009)
 Vater unser (Our Father) for boy soprano or countertenor or children's choir, version with piano (2011) version with string orchestra or string quintet (2013)
 Beatus Petronius for 2 mixed choirs, woodwind octet, tubular bells and string orchestra (2011)
 Statuit ei Dominus for 2 mixed choirs, woodwind octet and string orchestra (2011)
 Habitare fratres in unum for mixed choir or vocal ensemble (2012)
 Virgencita (Virgin of Guadalupe) (2012)
 My Heart's in the Highlands for countertenor or alto, violin, viola, cello and piano (2013)
 Drei Hirtenkinder aus Fátima for mixed choir (2014)
 Songs from Childhood for children's choir and ensemble or piano (2015): Firefly's Song, Frogs, I Am Already Big, Ladybird's Song, Let the Snow Swish, Road to School, Santa Claus, Sleeping Beauty, Summer Waltz, The Book, The Doll Has No Name, The Little Motor-Scooter, The Song of Atom-Boy, Where Are You, Father Christmas?
 Kleine Litanei for mixed choir (2015)
 And I heard a voice... for mixed choir a cappella (2018)
 Prayer from "Kanon pokajanen" for mixed choir and string orchestra (2018)
 Our Garden for children's choir and ensemble (2019)
 Für Jan van Eyck for choir and organ (2020)

Orchestral works
 Nekrolog for orchestra Op. 5 (1960)
 Symphony No. 1: Polyphonic Op. 9 (1963)
 Perpetuum mobile for orchestra Op. 10 (1963)
 Symphony No. 2 for orchestra (1966)
 Symphony No. 3 for orchestra (1971)
 Wenn Bach Bienen gezüchtet hätte ... for piano, wind quintet, string orchestra and percussion (1976)
 Fratres for chamber ensemble (1976 and on, many versions)
 Arbos for eight brass instruments and percussion (1977/1986/2001)
 Cantus In Memoriam Benjamin Britten for string orchestra and bell (1977)
 Psalom for string orchestra (1985/1995/1997)
 Festina Lente for string orchestra and harp (1988)
 Summa for string orchestra (1991)
 Silouan's Song for string orchestra (1991)
 Trisagion for string orchestra (1992)
 Mein Weg for 14 string players and percussion (1999)
 Orient & Occident for string orchestra (2000)
 Lennartile / Für Lennart for string orchestra (2006)
 La Sindone for orchestra and percussion (2006)
 Symphony No. 4: Los Angeles (2008)
 These Words ... for string orchestra and percussion (2008)
 Silhouette (Hommage à Gustave Eiffel) for orchestra and percussion (2009)
 Swansong (2013)
 Greater Antiphons for string orchestra (2015)

Works for solo instruments and orchestra
 Collage sur B-A-C-H, for oboe, string orchestra, harpsichord, and piano (1964)
 Pro et Contra, concerto for cello and orchestra (1966, for Mstislav Rostropovich)
 Tabula Rasa, double concerto for two violins, string orchestra, and prepared piano (1977)
 Fratres for violin, string orchestra and percussion (1992)
 Concerto piccolo über B-A-C-H for trumpet, string orchestra, harpsichord and piano (1994)
 Darf ich ... for violin, bells and string orchestra (1995/1999)
 Fratres for guitar and orchestra (2000)
 Lamentate for piano and orchestra (2002)
 Passacaglia for 1-2 violin, string orchestra and vibraphone ad lib. (2003/2007, for Gidon Kremer's 60th birthday)
 In spe for wind quintet and string orchestra (2010)
 Sequentia for violin, percussion and string orchestra (2014)
 La Sindone for violin and orchestra (2019)

Chamber works
 Four Easy Dances for piano, "Music for a Children's Theatre": Puss in Boots, Red-Riding-Hood and Wolf, Butterfly, Dance of the Ducklings, for piano (1956/1957)
 Partita, Op. 2 for piano (1958)
 2 Sonatinen Op. 1, for piano (1958/1959)
 Quintettino Op. 13, for wind quintet (1964)
 Collage über B-A-C-H for oboe and strings (1964)
 Trivium for organ (1976)
 Für Alina for piano (1976)
 Pari intervallo in four parts without fixed instrumentation (1976)
 Version for organ (1980)
 Version for four recorders (1980)
 Version for clarinet, trombone and string orchestra (1995)
 Version for saxophone quartet (2002)
 Version for two pianos or piano duet (2008)
 Version for 8 or 4 celli (2010)
 Variationen zur Gesundung von Arinuschka for piano (1977)
 Fratres (1977–1992)
 Fratres for string quintet or wind quintet (original version)
 Fratres for violin and piano; or cello and piano; or viola and piano
 Fratres for string orchestra and percussion
 Fratres for violin, string orchestra and percussion
 Fratres for cello/viola/guitar/trombone, string orchestra and percussion
 Fratres for string quartet
 Fratres for four percussionists
 Fratres for 4, 8 or 12 cellos
 Fratres for three recorder players, cello (or viola da gamba) and percussion
 Fratres for wind octet and percussion
 Fratres for chamber ensemble
 Spiegel im Spiegel (1978-2011)
 for violin or viola or cello and piano (1978)
 for clarinet or bass clarinet or horn and piano (2003)
 for double bass and piano (2005)
 for alto flute, oboe or cor anglais and piano (2007)
 for bassoon and piano (2009)
 for organ and piano (2010)
 for baritone saxophone and piano (2011)
 Annum per annum for organ (1980)
 Hymn to a Great City for two pianos (1984/2000)
 Festina lente for string section and harp (1988)
 Mein Weg hat Gipfel und Wellentäler for organ (1989)
 Summa (1990-2010)
 for string quartet (1990)
 for recorder quartet  (2005)
 for trombone quartet  (2008)
 for saxophone quartet  (2009)
 for guitar quartet, cello quartet or cello octet (2010)
 for 2 guitars (2011)
 Psalom for string quartet (1991/1993), for 8 celli (2010)
 Mozart-Adagio for violin, cello and piano (1992/1997), for clarinet, cello and piano (2017) from Mozart's Piano Sonata in F major, K. 280
 Passacaglia for violin and piano (2003)
 Für Anna Maria for piano (2006)
 Estländler for flute (2006) or violin (2009)
 Scala cromatica for violin, cello and piano (2007)
 O-Antiphonen for 8 celli (2008)
 Solfeggio for string quartet or saxophone quartet (2008), for 4 or 8 cellos (2010)
 Missa brevis for 12 cellos (2009) or 8 celli (2010)
 Ukuaru Waltz for piano (2010), for accordion (2016) from film score for Ukuaru (1973)
 Da pacem Domine for 4 or 8 celli (2010)
 Kyrie eleison for bells of the Rakvere Church of the Trinity (2010)
 Silouan's Song for 8 celli (2012)
 Nunc Dimittis for 9 saxophones (2016)
 Estonian Lullaby for violin and piano (2019)
 Vater unser for saxophone quartet (2019)

Selected discography
 Tabula Rasa (ECM New Series, CD/LP 1984)
 Arbos (ECM New Series, CD/LP 1987)
 Passio (ECM New Series, CD/LP 1988)
 Miserere (ECM New Series, CD/LP 1991)
 Te Deum (ECM New Series, CD/LP 1993)
 Collage (Chandos Records, CD 1993)
 Litany (ECM New Series, CD/LP 1996)
 Beatus (Virgin Classics/EMI, CD 1997)
 De Profundis (Harmonia Mundi, CD)
 Kanon Pokajanen (ECM New Series, 2xCD 1998)
 Sanctuary (Virgin Classics/EMI, CD 1998)
 I Am The True Vine (Harmonia Mundi, CD 1999)
 Alina (ECM New Series, 1999)
 Orchestral Works (Naxos, CD 2000)
 Te Deum (Deutsche Grammophon/Universal Classics, CD 2000)
 Orient & Occident (ECM New Series, CD 2002)
 Summa (Virgin Classics/EMI, CD 2002)
 Passio (Naxos, CD 2003)
 Triodion (Hyperion, CD 2003)
 Pro & Contra (Virgin Classics/EMI, CD 2004)
 Summa (Naxos, CD 2004)
 Arvo Pärt: A Portrait (Naxos, Compilation CD 2005)
 Lamentate (ECM New Series, 2005)
 Da Pacem (Harmonia Mundi, CD 2006)
 Triodion • Ode VII • I Am The True Vine • Dopo La Vittoria (Naxos, CD 2006)
 Pilgrim's Song (Estonian Record Productions, CD 2009)
 In Principio (ECM New Series, CD 2009)
 Symphony No. 4 (ECM, New Series CD 2010)
 Cantique (Sony Classical Records, SACD 2010)
 Vater unser (Estonian Record Productions, CD 2011)
 Adam's Lament (ECM New Series 2012)
 The Symphonies (ECM New Series 2018)

References

External links
 Arvo Pärt biography and work list on the Universal Edition website

 
Part, Arvo